Mesosa subrupta is a species of beetle in the family Cerambycidae. It was described by Stephan von Breuning in 1968. It is known to be found in Vietnam.

References

subrupta
Beetles described in 1968